Pedro Ibarra (born 11 September 1985) is an Argentine former field hockey player who played as a defender. He represented the Argentine national team from 2004 to 2021.

Career
He made his debut for the national squad in 2004, after having played the Junior World Cup in Rotterdam, Netherlands. He finished in tenth place with his national team at the 2006 Men's Hockey World Cup in Mönchengladbach, and in tenth at the 2012 Summer Olympics. Pedro won the bronze medal at the 2014 Men's Hockey World Cup and three gold medals at the Pan American Games. He played in Spain for Real Club de Polo de Barcelona. In July 2019, he was selected in the Argentina squad for the 2019 Pan American Games. They won the gold medal by defeating Canada 5-2 in the final. He retired after the 2020 Summer Olympics having played for 17 years for the national team.

References

External links

1985 births
Living people
Argentine male field hockey players
Male field hockey defenders
People from San Fernando de la Buena Vista
World Series Hockey players
2006 Men's Hockey World Cup players
Field hockey players at the 2007 Pan American Games
2010 Men's Hockey World Cup players
Field hockey players at the 2011 Pan American Games
Field hockey players at the 2012 Summer Olympics
2014 Men's Hockey World Cup players
Field hockey players at the 2015 Pan American Games
Field hockey players at the 2016 Summer Olympics
2018 Men's Hockey World Cup players
Field hockey players at the 2019 Pan American Games
Olympic field hockey players of Argentina
Pan American Games gold medalists for Argentina
Pan American Games silver medalists for Argentina
Olympic gold medalists for Argentina
Olympic medalists in field hockey
Medalists at the 2016 Summer Olympics
Pan American Games medalists in field hockey
South American Games gold medalists for Argentina
South American Games medalists in field hockey
Real Club de Polo de Barcelona players
HC Den Bosch players
SCHC players
Expatriate field hockey players
Argentine expatriate sportspeople in the Netherlands
Argentine expatriate sportspeople in Spain
Competitors at the 2014 South American Games
Men's Hoofdklasse Hockey players
División de Honor de Hockey Hierba players
Medalists at the 2007 Pan American Games
Medalists at the 2011 Pan American Games
Medalists at the 2015 Pan American Games
Medalists at the 2019 Pan American Games
Field hockey players at the 2020 Summer Olympics
Sportspeople from Buenos Aires Province